Paul Grauschopf (born 15 August 1998) is a German footballer who plays as a defensive midfielder for Bayernliga club SV Donaustauf.

Career
Grauschopf made his debut on for SpVgg Unterhaching on 3 August 2019, starting in the home match against Hansa Rostock which finished as a 1–0 win.

On 11 July 2021, Grauschopf signed a two-year contract with Bayernliga club SV Donaustauf.

References

External links
 Profile at DFB.de
 Profile at kicker.de

1998 births
Living people
People from Straubing-Bogen
Sportspeople from Lower Bavaria
Footballers from Bavaria
German footballers
Germany youth international footballers
Association football central defenders
RB Leipzig II players
FC Ingolstadt 04 II players
SpVgg Unterhaching players
3. Liga players
Regionalliga players
Bayernliga players